is a city in Kanagawa Prefecture, Japan, one of the main cities of Greater Tokyo Area and Keihin Industrial Area. It is the second most populated city in Kanagawa Prefecture after Yokohama, and the eighth most populated city in Japan (including the Tokyo Metropolitan Area).

, the city has an estimated population of 1,503,690, with 716,470 households, and a population density of 10,000 persons per km2. Kawasaki is the only city in Japan with more than one million inhabitants that is not a prefectural capital.

History

Prehistoric and Ancient era 
Archaeological evidence from the Japanese Paleolithic and Jōmon period can only be found in the northwest Tama Hills. The course of the Tama and the coast of the Bay of Tokyo have also changed in historical times, so that large parts of the urban area are geologically young.

Classical era

Nara period to the Sengoku period 
With the introduction of the Ritsuryō legal system, the area came to the Musashi Province in the 7th century. In the Nara period, the center of the Tachibana district was probably in the area of today's Takatsu district. Since the Heian period, the domain of the Inage clan has expanded here. Around the Heiken-ji Buddhist temple (better known as Kawasaki-Daishi), founded in 1128, a monzen-machi, a busy district for the supply of pilgrims, soon emerged. Between the Kamakura period and Sengoku period, smaller feudal lords ruled the area until it finally came under the control of the Later Hōjō clan.

Early Modern 
In 1611, Koizumi Jidayū had Nikaryō Yōsui built, a canal system on the right bank of the Tama for irrigating the fields, which in some cases still runs through the densely built-up city. On the long-distance Kaidō roads Tōkaidō and Nakaharakaidō built by Edo-Bakufu, stations were built in the area of what would later become Kawasaki, which increased its importance. The Kawasaki station (Kawasaki-juku, near today's Kawasaki station) on the Tōkaidō was not officially recognized until 1623 as the last of the 53 Tōkaidō stations. The Bakufu let the bridges over the Tama collapse and there were ferry connections to nearby Edo in several places in today's Kawasaki, which laid the foundation for the development of the city.

Modern 
The rapid urbanization of the area, which continues to this day, began in the Meiji and Taishō eras. In 1872, Kawasaki Station was established on the Tōkaidō Main Line which was Japan's first railway line. In 1889, the city (machi) Kawasaki in the district (gun) Tachibana was created according to the Japanese municipal system introduced the year before. In 1912 the border between Kanagawa and Tokyo prefectures was established as the Tama River. On July 1, 1924, the independent city (shi-) of Kawasaki with 48,394 inhabitants was formed through a merger with the city of Daishi (formerly Daishigawara) and the village of Miyuki.

World War II 
As part of World War II, the city was bombed three times by the United States Army Air Forces (USAAF) between April 1945 and July 1945. The most serious attack was an area bombing with Napalm bombs on April 15, 1945. The attacks destroyed around 35% of the urban area and claimed 1,520 dead and 8,759 injured. The attacks burned down 9.3 km2 of the city (see Bombing of Tokyo).

Contemporary period

Shōwa era (1945–1989)
On April 15, 1945, large parts of the area around the train station and the industrial area at the port were destroyed by air raids. Since the 1950s, residential areas for commuters have been created in the northeastern part of the city, which are connected directly to the centers of Tokyo by new railway lines. On April 1, 1972, Kawasaki became a decree-designated city (seirei shitei toshi) with 5 districts. 1973 the population exceeded the million mark. In 1982 the new districts of Miyamae and Asao were created by splitting off from the districts of Takatsu and Tama. In the course of deindustrialization, industrial areas have recently been increasingly converted into residential areas (mostly Multi-family residential), so that a further increase in population density can be expected.

Geography

Climate

Location 
Kawasaki is located on the right bank of the Tama River, which flows into the Tokyo Bay here. The city lies like a narrow band between Tokyo in the northeast and Yokohama in the southwest. The city connects the two major cities and is part of the Greater Tokyo Area, the largest and most densely populated urban areas in the world.

The eastern area along the coast of Tokyo Bay is a densely populated industrial zone, part of the Keihin Industrial Zone. In contrast, the western districts in the Tama Hills consist largely of residential areas for commuters in the Tokyo / Yokohama region.

Wards 
Kawasaki has seven wards (ku):

Adjacent cities and towns 
In the northeast, Kawasaki borders the Special wards of Tokyo (starting at Tokyo Bay) Ōta and Setagaya, in the northwest the cities (-shi) belonging to Tokyo Prefecture (-shi) Komae, Chofu, Machida, Inagi, Tama enclose the place. The opposite southwest side is entirely occupied by the districts of Tsurumi, Kōhoku, Tsuzuki and Aoba in the city of Yokohama. With the completion of the Tokyo Bay Aqua-Line, the city of Kisarazu, located on the opposite side of the Tokyo Bay in Chiba Prefecture, also became a neighbor in December 1997.

Water 
Two rivers cross the urban area. The Tama unites with the tributaries Misawa, Yamashita, Gotanda, Nikaryō main river and Hirase; Katahira, Asao, Shimpukuji, Arima, E, Shibu and Yagami flow into the Tsurumi.

The land on the coast of the city is crossed by a network of canals (Tama Canal, Suehiro Canal, Chidori Canal, Yakō Canal, Daishi Canal, Mizue Canal, Shiohama Canal, Iriesaki Canal, Asano Canal, Ikegami Canal, Minami-Watarida Canal, Tanabe Canal, Shiraishi Canal and the Sakai Canal). In addition, the historic Nikaryō Yōsui canal still exists in the hinterland.

Historical population

Politics and government 
Kawasaki is governed by Mayor Norihiko Fukuda, an independent elected on 27 October 2013. The city assembly has 63 elected members. Mayor Fukuda was re-elected to a second term in office on 22 October 2017 with support from LDP and Kōmeitō against former municipal MP Akiko Yoshizawa and KPJ-supported former primary school teacher Hirokazu Ichiko.

The 60-member city parliament of Kawasaki was re-elected in the unified elections in April 2019. The LDP remained the strongest with 19 seats.

Kawasaki was in June 2008 the second Japanese "government-designated city" (seirei shitei toshi) after Hiroshima, which allowed foreigners to participate in municipal referendums.

In the 105-member prefectural parliament of Kanagawa, the districts of Kawasaki used as constituencies together choose 18 deputies.

For the House of Representatives (Japan), Kawasaki comprises the constituencies Kanagawa 9 (in the west), 10 (in the east) and 18 (in the middle). In the 2017 election, these went unchanged to Liberal Democrats Kazunori Tanaka and Daishirō Yamagiwa and ex-Democrat Hirofumi Ryū for the Kibō no Tō (Party of Hope, later to the Mirai Nippon faction).

Elections 
 2005 Kawasaki mayoral election

List of mayors of Kawasaki (from 1924)

Sports

Facilities

Baseball
 Kawasaki Stadium: Located in Kawasaki-ku. Opened in 1952, and was used as a home field for professional baseball teams (see below) from 1954 to 1991. The stands were taken down in 2001, and is currently used for American football games and other events in addition to baseball.
 Kawasaki Todoroki Baseball Stadium: Located in Nakahara-ku. Maximum capacity of 5,000 people. Used for preliminary rounds of high school baseball and American football games.

Field athletics & football
 Todoroki Athletics Stadium: Located in Nakahara-ku. Maximum capacity of 25,000 people. Opened in 1964, the stadium underwent several renovations before becoming the home field for the Kawasaki Frontale. Also used frequently for track & field competitions.

Indoor facilities
 Kawasaki Prefectural Gymnasium: Located in Kawasaki-ku. Opened in 1956, and is used for Puroresu matches. 20 minutes walking distance from Kawasaki Station's east entrance.
 Kawasaki Todoroki Arena: Located in Nakahara-ku. International field athletics and volleyball matches are held here, in addition to various musical concerts, and becoming the home for the Kawasaki Brave Thunders.

Cycling & horseracing
 Velodrome: Kawasaki Velodrome
 Kawasaki Keiba

Economy

Fujitsu's Main Branch is located in Nakahara-ku. It was formerly Fujitsu's headquarters.

Kawasaki has several factories and development bases of the companies of heavy industry (e.g., JFE Group, Nippon Oil Corporation) and high technology (Fujitsu, NEC Corporation, Toshiba, Dell Japan and Sigma Corporation).

Culture and sights

Temples and shrines

 Kawasaki Daishi (Heiken-ji). A Buddhist temple in the Kawasaki district. It is the second most visited temple in the Kantō region
 Mikawari Fudō shrine
 Shinkō Temple (Shinkō-ji) in the spring and autumn garden (Shunjū-en)
 Kotohira Shrine (Kotohira-jinja)
 Takaishi Shrine (Takaishi-jinja)
 Jōraku Temple (Jōraku-ji)
 Tenshōkō daijin shrine (Tenshōkō daijin)
 Kanayama Shrine: Site of the annual Kanamara Matsuri (Festival Of The Steel Phallus).

Museums and galleries

 Nihon Minka-en Open Air Museum (Tama District): with minka traditional farmhouses from different regions of Japan.
 Railway and bus museum
 Toshiba Museum
 Kawasaki City Museum
 Taro Okamoto Museum of Art
 Fujiko F. Fujio Museum: also known as Doraemon museum, opened on September 3, 2011, in Tama-ku Ward.

Music
 Myūza Kawasaki Symphonic Hall - home of the Tokyo Symphony Orchestra
 CLUB CITTA
 Yomiuri-Land EAST (Open Air Music Theater)

Recreational facilities
Kawasaki Racecourse
Keirin cycle track Kawasaki
Kawasaki Marien (leisure center)
Yomiuri Land

Parks
Ikuta green space (Ikuta ryokuchi)
Todoroki Ryokuchi: athletic park
Yumemigasaki Zoo (Yumemigasaki dōbutsu kōen)

Regular events
Daruma market in Shimo-Asao
Tamagawa fireworks display
Sannō festival at the Inage shrine
Shin-Yuri art festival
Kawasaki Citizens' Festival
Kawasaki fantasy night
Kawasaki Robot Congress
In Unity
Kanamara Matsuri

Places of interest 
 Nakagawa stable: stable of professional sumo wrestler
 Kawasaki Warehouse: An amusement arcade whose aesthetic is inspired by the Kowloon Walled City.
 Koreatown: eastern Kawasaki has the second largest concentration of Koreans in Japan, after Osaka. In 1997 it became the first municipality to allow non-Japanese nationals to take civil service employment.

Transportation

Railway stations
  East Japan Railway Company
  Tōkaidō Main Line
 -  -
  Keihin-Tōhoku Line
 - Kawasaki -
  Nambu Line
 Main Line : Kawasaki -  -  (Yakō Station is in Tsurumi-ku, Yokohama) -  -  -  -  -  -  -  -  -  -  -  -  -  -
 Branch Line : Shitte -  -  - 
  Tsurumi Line
 Main Line : -  - Hama-Kawasaki -  - 
 Ōkawa Branch : - 
  Yokosuka Line, Shōnan-Shinjuku Line
 - Musashi-Kosugi -  -
  Odakyu Electric Railway
  Odakyū Line
 -  -  -  -  -  -  - 
  Tama Line
 Shin-Yurigaoka -  -  -  -  -
  Keio Corporation
  Sagamihara Line
 -  -  -  (Keiō-Yomiuri-Land Station and Inagi Station are in Inagi, Tokyo.) - 
  Keikyu Corporation
  Keikyū Main Line
 - Hatchōnawate -  -
  Daishi Line
 Keikyū Kawasaki -  -  -  -  -  - 
  Tokyu Corporation
  Tōyoko Line
 -  - Musashi-Kosugi -  -
  Meguro Line
 - Shin-Maruko - Musashi-Kosugi - Motosumiyoshi -
  Den-en-toshi Line
 -  -  -  -  -  -  -  -
  Ōimachi Line
 - Futako-Shinchi - Takatsu - Mizonokuchi

Highways 

 Expressway
 Tōmei Expressway is a north-south expressway running from Tokyo to Nagoya and in central area. Tōmei-Kawasaki Interchange is served from Kawasaki.
 Daisan Keihin Road is a north-south expressway running from Tokyo to Hodogaya-ku, Yokohama and in central area. Keihin-Kawasaki Interchange is served from Kawasaki.
 Shuto Expressway Route K1 (Yokohane Route) is a north-south expressway running from Shuto Expressway Route 1 to Shuto Expressway Route K3 (Kariba Route) and in southern area. Daishi Interchange, Hama-Kawasaki Interchange, and Asada Interchange are served from Kawasaki.
 Bayshore Route is a north-south expressway running from Kanazawa-ku, Yokohama to Ichikawa, Chiba and in southern area. Ukishima Interchange and Higashi-Ōgishima Interchange are served from Kawasaki.
 Shuto Expressway Route K6 (Kawasaki Route) is an expressway in southern area. Daishi Interchange, Tonomachi Interchange, and Ukishima Interchange are served from Kawasaki.
 Tokyo Bay Aqua-Line is an expressway across Tokyo Bay from Kawasaki-ku, Kawasaki to Kisarazu, Chiba. Ukishima Interchange is served from Kawasaki.

 National Route
 National Route 1 and 15 are north-south highways running in southern area. Due to elongated territory from east to west, these highways run short length in Kawasaki.
 Japan National Route 246 is a north-south highways running in central area. It also runs short length in Kawasaki.
 Japan National Route 132 is short highway running in southern area. It bounds National Route 15 and port of kawasaki.
 Japan National Route 357 is an industrial highway in southern area. It runs only in Higashi-Ōgishima Island in Kawasaki.
 Japan National Route 409 is a highway running from Takatsu-ku, Kawasaki to Narita, Chiba. It bounds central area and downtown area in Kawasaki.

International relations

Twin cities
Kawasaki is twinned with the following cities in Japan and worldwide.

Domestic friendship cities
  Fujimi, Nagano (since April 22, 1993)
  Naha, Okinawa (since May 20, 1996)
  Nakashibetsu, Hokkaido (since July 9, 1992)

International

  Baltimore, Maryland, United States (since June 14, 1979)
  Bà Rịa–Vũng Tàu province, Vietnam (since September 15, 2012)
  Bucheon, Gyeonggi Province, South Korea (since October 21, 1996)
  Lübeck, Germany (since May 12, 1992)
  Milwaukee, Wisconsin, United States (since June 20, 1993)
  Rijeka, Croatia (since June 23, 1977)
  Salzburg, Austria (since April 17, 1992)
  Sheffield, United Kingdom (since July 30, 1990)
  Shenyang, Liaoning, China, since (August 18, 1981)
  Wollongong, New South Wales, Australia (since May 18, 1988)

Friendship ports
  Da Nang, Vietnam, since January 24, 1994

References

External links

 

 
Cities in Kanagawa Prefecture
Port settlements in Japan
Populated coastal places in Japan
Cities designated by government ordinance of Japan